William Wade Fitzherbert Pullen (24 June 1866 – 9 August 1937) was an English cricketer. A wicket keeper for Gloucestershire, Pullen played ninety-four first-class cricket matches between 1882 and 1892. He took sixty-three catches and performed four stumpings. A right-hand bat, he scored 2,765 runs with a single century of 161 made in 1884. He also played for the Gentlemen, Rest of England and South of England teams on occasion.

References
Notes

Sources

1866 births
1937 deaths
People from South Gloucestershire District
Gloucestershire cricketers
English cricketers
Gentlemen cricketers
Sportspeople from Gloucestershire
North v South cricketers